Redbird is a town in Wagoner County, Oklahoma, United States. The population was 137 at the 2010 census, a 10.5 percent decline from the figure of 153 in 2000. Founded at the turn of the 20th century, it was one of more than fifty all-black towns in Oklahoma Territory and Indian Territory and is one of thirteen surviving black communities in Oklahoma.

History
Redbird, also called Red Bird, originated with the settlement by the family of E. L. Barber, who founded the First Baptist Church in 1889. Other families soon moved into the area. By 1902, Red Bird had obtained a post office. More than 600 people showed up at the official opening of Red Bird on August 10, 1907. 

The town advertised in newspapers all across the South to encourage black families to relocate there. Redbird's population attained a peak of 336 in 1920. Declining cotton prices caused residents to move away, even before the Great Depression. It rebounded after World War II, and at one point had seven churches, a couple of general stores, eight juke joints, and a gas station.  

Urbanization in later years lost the town population again, and the post office closed; however, the town is experiencing something of a rebirth as families buy homes in the area to enjoy a low crime rate and a quieter pace of life.

Geography
Redbird is located at  (35.888676, -95.588211).

Demographics

As of the census of 2000, there were 153 people, 64 households, and 33 families residing in the town. There were 76 housing units at an average density of 91.9 per square mile (35.4/km2). The racial makeup of the town was 87.58% African American, 5.88% Native American, 4.58% White, 0.65% from other races, and 1.31% from two or more races. Hispanic or Latino of any race were 1.96% of the population.

There were 64 households, out of which 32.8% had children under the age of 18 living with them, 23.4% were married couples living together, 18.8% had a female householder with no husband present, and 46.9% were non-families. 39.1% of all households were made up of individuals, and 17.2% had someone living alone who was 65 years of age or older. The average household size was 2.39 and the average family size was 3.26.

In the town, the population was spread out, with 33.3% under the age of 18, 11.1% from 18 to 24, 21.6% from 25 to 44, 22.2% from 45 to 64, and 11.8% who were 65 years of age or older. The median age was 32 years. For every 100 females, there were 104.0 males. For every 100 females age 18 and over, there were 72.9 males.

The median income for a household in the town was $15,139, and the median income for a family was $30,625. Males had a median income of $28,750 versus $25,833 for females. The per capita income for the town was $8,944. About 27.3% of families and 36.6% of the population were below the poverty line, including 44.6% of those under the age of eighteen and 43.5% of those 65 or over.

Education
Redbird residents are assigned to schools in the Porter Consolidated Schools. The students travel  to the nearest schools since Porter Consolidated does not operate any schools in Redbird. Redbird was previously served by Red Bird Public Schools.

See also
 Boley, Brooksville, Clearview, Grayson, Langston, Lima, Rentiesville, Summit, Taft, Tatums, Tullahassee, and Vernon, other "All-Black" settlements that were part of the Land Run of 1889.

References

External links
 All-Black Towns of Oklahoma

Towns in Wagoner County, Oklahoma
Towns in Oklahoma
Populated places in Oklahoma established by African Americans
Pre-statehood history of Oklahoma